This is a list of hospitals in Grenada.

General Hospital – St. George's
Mount Gay Hospital – St. George's
Old Trafford Medical Center – St. George's
Princess Alice Hospital – St. Andrew Parish
Princess Royal Hospital – Hillsborough,  Carriacou Island
St Augustine's Medical Services – St. George's
St. George's University School of Medicine – St. George's
Marryshows' Hospital & Health Clinic – St. George's
Salus Clinic – St. George's

References 

Grenada
Hospitals
Hospitals
Hospitals
Grenada